Hyaloctoides superhyalinus is a species of tephritid or fruit flies in the genus Hyaloctoides of the family Tephritidae.

Distribution
Namibia.

References

Tephritinae
Insects described in 1929
Diptera of Africa